Justice James may refer to:

Amaziah B. James (1812–1883), judge of the New York Court of Appeals
Arthur James (judge) (1916–1976), Lord Justice of Appeal of Britain
Charles Pinckney James (1818–1899), associate justice of the Supreme Court of the District of Columbia
Richard James (Oklahoma politician) (1926–2013), special justice on the Oklahoma Supreme Court
William Milbourne James (judge) (1807–1881), Lord Justice of Appeal of Britain

See also
Lord Justice James (disambiguation)
Judge James (disambiguation)
James Justice (1698–1763), Scottish horticulturalist/gardener
Jim Justice (born James Conley Justice II, born 1951), Governor of West Virginia